Robert David "Chip" Lang (born August 21, 1952) is former Major League Baseball pitcher.

External links

1952 births
Living people
American expatriate baseball players in Canada
Baseball players from Pittsburgh
Denver Bears players
Gulf Coast Expos players
Memphis Blues players
Montreal Expos players
Québec Carnavals players
Shelby Pirates players
West Palm Beach Expos players